8 Spruce Street, previously known as the Beekman Tower and New York by Gehry, is a 76-story skyscraper designed by architect Frank Gehry on Spruce Street in the Financial District of Manhattan, New York City.

8 Spruce Street is one of the tallest residential towers in the world, and it was the tallest residential tower in the Western Hemisphere at the time of opening in February 2011. The building was developed by Forest City Ratner and designed by Frank Gehry Architects. WSP Cantor Seinuk was the lead structural engineer, Jaros, Baum & Bolles provided MEP engineering, and Kreisler Borg Florman was construction manager.  It contains a public elementary school owned by the Department of Education.  Above that and grade-level retail, the tower contains only residential rental units.  The skyscraper's structural frame is made of reinforced concrete, and form-wise it falls within the architectural style of Deconstructivism.

Site
8 Spruce Street is located on the south side of Spruce Street, between William and Nassau Streets, in the Financial District of Lower Manhattan. It is just east of City Hall Park and south of Pace University and the Brooklyn Bridge. Immediately to the west are 150 Nassau Street and the Morse Building (140 Nassau Street). Prior to 8 Spruce Street's construction, the lot was used as parking for the NewYork-Presbyterian Lower Manhattan Hospital immediately to the east.

Design and usage

School 
It hosts over 600 students enrolled in pre-kindergarten through eighth grade classes. A fourth floor roof deck holds  of outdoor play space.

Apartments
Above the elementary school is a 904-unit luxury residential tower clad in stainless steel. All units are priced at market-rate, with no low or moderate income-restricted apartments. All units are rental-only; none are available for purchase.

Hospital
The building originally included space for New York Downtown Hospital next door. The hospital was allocated , of parking below ground. It was never used. As of 2016, it is a commercially-operated valet parking garage.

Public space
There are public plazas on both the east and west sides of the building, one  and the other somewhat smaller.

History 

8 Spruce Street opened in February 2011.

During the COVID-19 pandemic in New York City in 2020, about one of every five units were vacant. The building's owners, Brookfield Property Partners and Nuveen, placed the building for sale in November 2021 with an asking price of $850 million. Bloomberg reported in late 2021 that Blackstone Inc. would likely purchase the property for $930 million, and multiple sources have confirmed the sale.  Blackstone established 8 Spruce (NY) Owner LLC in December 2021 to serve as owner.

Critical reception

Early reviews of 8 Spruce Street were favorable. In The New York Times, architecture critic Nicolai Ouroussoff praised the building's design as a welcome addition to the skyline of New York, calling it: "the finest skyscraper to rise in New York since Eero Saarinen's CBS Building went up 46 years ago". New Yorker magazine's Paul Goldberger described it as "one of the most beautiful towers downtown". Comparing Gehry's tower to the nearby Woolworth Building, completed in 1913, Goldberger said, "It is the first thing built downtown since then that actually deserves to stand beside it."

CityRealty architecture critic Carter Horsely hailed the project, saying "the building would have been an unquestioned architectural masterpiece if the south façade had continued the crinkling and if the base had continued the stainless-steel cladding. Even so, it is as majestic as its cross-town rival, the great neo-Gothic Woolworth Building designed by Cass Gilbert at 233 Broadway on the other side of City Hall Park." Gehry designed both the exterior, interiors and amenities spaces, along with all 20 model apartments.

The building received the Emporis Skyscraper Award for 2011.

See also

 11 Hoyt
 MIRA Tower
 List of tallest buildings in New York City
 List of tallest buildings in the United States

 List of tallest buildings in the world
 List of works by Frank Gehry
 List of tallest residential buildings in the world

References

External links

 

Frank Gehry buildings
Residential skyscrapers in Manhattan
Residential buildings completed in 2010
Apartment buildings in New York City
Forest City Realty Trust
Civic Center, Manhattan
Financial District, Manhattan
2010 establishments in New York City